The 2018 NCAA Division I Wrestling Championships took place from March 15 to March 17 in Cleveland, Ohio, at the Quicken Loans Arena. The tournament went into its 88th NCAA Division I Wrestling Championships, and featured 62 teams across that level.

Team results

 Note: Top 10 only
 (H): Team from hosting U.S. state

Individual results
 Note: Table does not include wrestlebacks
 (H): Individual from hosting U.S. State
Source:

References

2018 in American sports
2018 in sport wrestling
2018 in sports in Ohio
March 2018 sports events in the United States